The Samsung Galaxy A53 5G is a mid-range Android-based smartphone developed and manufactured by Samsung Electronics as a part of its Galaxy 
A series. The phone was announced on 17 March 2022 at Samsung Galaxy Unpacked event alongside the Galaxy A33 5G and Galaxy A73 5G.

Galaxy A53 5G Phone's price is $449 for a 128 GB model. The size of the screen is 6.5-inch which runs on Samsung's Exynos 5 nm processor. The phone has a quad-camera system featuring 64 MP main camera with 32 MP front camera.

Design 

The display is made of Corning Gorilla Glass 5. The back panel and side are made of frosted plastic.

The design of the smartphone is similar to its predecessor, but as in the Samsung Galaxy A33 5G and Samsung Galaxy A73 5G, the rear panel is now completely flat, and the transition between the rear panel and the camera unit is smoother.  The Galaxy A53 5G, unlike the Samsung Galaxy A52, does not have a 3.5 mm audio jack.  Also Galaxy A53 5G has protection against moisture and dust according to the IP67 standard.

Below are USB-C connector, speaker, microphone and depending on the version slot for 1 SIM card and microSD memory card up to 1 TB or hybrid slot for 2 SIM cards.  The second microphone is located on top.  On the right side are the volume buttons and the smartphone lock button.

The smartphone is sold in 4 colors: black (Awesome Black), white (Awesome White), blue (Awesome Blue) and orange (Awesome Peach).

Specifications

Hardware 
The Galaxy A53 5G is a smartphone with a slate-type factor form, which is 159.6 × 74.8 × 8.1 mm in size and weighs 189 grams.

The device is equipped with GSM, HSPA, LTE and 5G connectivity, Wi-Fi 802.11 a/b/g/n/ac dual-band with Bluetooth 5.1, Wi-Fi Direct support and hotspot support with A2DP and LE, GPS with BeiDou, Galileo, GLONASS and QZSS and NFC. It has a USB Type-C 2.0 port. It is dust and water resistant with IP67 certification.

It has a 6.5 inch diagonal Super AMOLED display with Infinity-O-type punch-hole camera, rounded corners, FHD+ resolution of 1080 × 2400 pixels, with an adaptive refresh rate up to 120 Hz protected by Gorilla Glass 5.

The 5000mAh lithium polymer battery is non-removable and supports fast charging at 25 W.

The chipset is a Samsung Exynos 1280 with an octagonal CPU (2 cores at 2.4 GHz + 6 cores at 2 GHz). UFS type 2 internal memory is 128/256 GB expandable with microSD up to 1 TB, while the RAM is 6 or 8 GB (depending on the version chosen).

The rear camera array features four cameras, a 64 MP main camera, a 12 MP ultrawide, a 5 MP macro, and a 5 MP depth.

Software 
The operating system is Android 12 "Snow Cone" with One UI 4.1.

References 

A53 5G
Mobile phones introduced in 2022
Android (operating system) devices
Galaxy A53 5G
Phablets
Mobile phones with multiple rear cameras
Mobile phones with 4K video recording